Joseph Ndjumbi (born 3 January 1965) is a Gabonese judoka. He competed in the men's half-heavyweight event at the 1992 Summer Olympics.

References

External links
 

1965 births
Living people
Gabonese male judoka
Olympic judoka of Gabon
Judoka at the 1992 Summer Olympics
Place of birth missing (living people)
21st-century Gabonese people
African Games medalists in judo
Competitors at the 1991 All-Africa Games
African Games bronze medalists for Gabon